Shlomo "Chich" Lahat (November 9, 1927 – October 1, 2014) was a major general in the Israel Defense Forces and former Head of the Manpower Directorate. He served as the eighth mayor of Tel Aviv in 1974–1993, for four consecutive terms. After election on the Likud ticket in 1974, he was re-elected in 1978, 1983 and 1989. He coined the slogan about Tel Aviv being "the city that never stops."

Biography 
Shlomo Lindner (later Lahat) was born in Germany. He immigrated to Mandatory Palestine with his family in 1933 after the Nazis came to power. The family settled in Rehovot. Lahat's nickname “Cheech” dates back to when he played tug-of-war with this friends at the age of eight. “I would yell ‘zieh’ – ‘Pull’ (in German) – to my friends, and they made it into ‘Cheech,’ and it stuck with me to this day," he later recalled. Lahat was a member of Hashomer Hatzair youth movement and attended Gymnasia Herzliya high school in Tel Aviv.

Lahat was married to Ziva, former director of the Humanities Library at Tel Aviv University. They had two children, Dan and Avner. He is also survived by his eight grandchildren including, Roan, Noam, Adam, Michaela, Yasmine, Tom, Arielle, and Yehonatan. His son, Dan Lahat, is a Tel Aviv city council member for the Yesh Atid party.

Military and political career
Lahat served in the Haganah and then the Israel Defense Forces. While serving in the IDF, he studied law at Hebrew University of Jerusalem. In 1956, he was the first Israeli officer to study at the U.S. Army Command and General Staff College at Fort Leavenworth, Kansas. Upon his return, he became an instructor at the IDF Command and Staff School. In 1959, he headed the Operations Branch of the General Staff Operations Department, transferring to the Armor Corps in 1962. In the Six-Day War he was appointed governor of East Jerusalem, and then head of the Central Command Staff with the rank of brigadier general. In 1969 he was appointed commander of the Armored Forces in Sinai. During the War of Attrition he was commander of operations at the Suez Canal. In 1970-1973, he served as chief of the Manpower Directorate.

In February 1974, he became the eighth mayor of Tel Aviv, continuing his tenure until November 1993. He was elected mayor as a member of the Likud.

On September 30, 2014, Lahat was admitted to Ichilov Hospital in critical condition due to a lung infection. He died on the morning of October 1, 2014.

References

Jewish Israeli politicians
Jewish mayors
Likud politicians
Mayors of Tel Aviv-Yafo
Israeli generals
Jewish emigrants from Nazi Germany to Mandatory Palestine
Burials at Trumpeldor Cemetery
1927 births
2014 deaths